Cities and Years is a 1930 Soviet silent drama film directed by Yevgeni Chervyakov.

Plot 
The film is based on the eponymous novel by Konstantin Fedin.

Cast 
 Bernhard Goetzke as Col. von Schonau
 Ivan Chuvelyov as Andrei Startsov
 Gennadiy Michurin as Kurt Van
 Sofiya Magarill as Marie Uhrbach
 Andrei Kostrichkin as Albert Birman (as A. Kostrichkin)
 David Gutman as Uhrbach
 M. Semakina as Martha Birman
 Boris Medvedev as Officer
 Pyotr Pirogov as Pole
 Sergei Ponachevny as A man in the cafe

References

External links 

1930 films
Films directed by Yevgeni Chervyakov
1930s Russian-language films
Soviet black-and-white films
Soviet drama films
1930 drama films
Soviet silent films